Elegy III is an abstract bronze sculpture, by Barbara Hepworth.

It is an edition of six.
Examples are located at the Kröller-Müller Museum, and Franklin D. Murphy Sculpture Garden, University of California, Los Angeles.

References

External links 
PublicArtinLA.com:  UCLA Murphy Sculpture Garden, Elegy III
 LAplaces.blogspot.com: UCLA Murphy Sculpture Garden
 Bluffton.edu:  Kröller-Müller Museum, Barbara Hepworth works

Sculptures by Barbara Hepworth
1966 sculptures
Modernist sculpture
Franklin D. Murphy Sculpture Garden
Abstract sculptures in California
Bronze sculptures in California
Outdoor sculptures in Greater Los Angeles
Abstract sculptures in the Netherlands
Bronze sculptures in the Netherlands
Sculptures in Amsterdam